The Model Aeronautical Association of Australia Inc (MAAA) is an organisation recognised by CASA as a Recreational Aviation Administration Organisation. MAAA has no regulatory authority conferred to it by the  CASA, however is required under a Deed of Agreement with CASA as an RAAO, to carry out certain functions on behalf of CASA paid from the public purse.
 It is affiliated to the Fédération Aéronautique Internationale through the Australian Sport Aviation Confederation. Founded in 1947, the MAAA presently has over 10,000 members down from a high of 12,000 in 2012 and total assets including flying fields, land and equipment worth more than $4 million AUD.

The MAAA is responsible for providing for its members: 
 public liability, personal injury, and executive insurance.
 a framework of rules for the safe operation of model aircraft.
 an access pathway to enter national, international, and world championship competitions.
 recognition by  CASA (Civil Aviation Safety Authority Australia) as a Recreational Aviation Administration Organisation (RAAO).
 recognition by CASA (Civil Aviation Safety Authority Australia) as the only Recreational Aviation Administrative Organisation (RAAO) for model aviation in Australia.

The MAAA previously produced a quarterly newsletter called Wingspan.

The MAAA offers a Wings program, teaching beginners how to safely operate radio controlled model aircraft.

History 
Aeromodelling started in Australia in the early 1900s following the invention of the aeroplane however, it was not until the 1930s that organised modelling groups appeared. Two rival groups formed in NSW, the MAA, Model Aeroplane Association of Australia in 1930 and the MFC, Model Flying Club of Australia in 1931. The two groups merged in 1947 to become the Model Aeronautical Association of Australia or MAAA.

The first national competition was held in 1938 and was organised as entertainment to coincide with Australia's 150th Anniversary. The competition was actually called the Grand International Model Aeroplane Championships and included indoor and outdoor Free Flight models only, a total of five events. It was hoped that model flyers from the UK and USA would come to the competition however it ended up being only Australian's and New Zealander's who attended.

World War 2 prevented any further flying competitions from occurring due to ban on model flying during the war, so as such, no competitions were held between 1939 and 1947.

The 2nd Nationals did not occur until 1948 after the MAAA had formed and it included Control line which was only new at the time and the 3rd Nationals in 1950 included radio controlled models. Following the 3rd Nationals there has been a Nationals in Australia every year since organised by the State Associations on a roster basis and usually held over the Christmas/New Year break at the end of the year.

Membership 
Individuals are able to join the MAAA through a recognized MAAA club or on their own in exceptional circumstances. Affiliate members are able to have a say in the running of the association through their State body which is the MAAA. Membership of the MAAA is gained through associate membership via State Associations whom the individual aeromodelling or flying clubs are members. People become affiliate members of the MAAA when they join an aeromodelling club or a state association.

State Associations
State Associations are the MAAA and have individual aeromodellers as members. The aeromodelling clubs are associate members of the relevant State Association. In other words, when someone joins a model flying club they become a member of that club and an associate member of their affiliated State Association as well as an affiliate member of the MAAA automatically. Individuals can also become associate members of other aeromodelling clubs if they want to. This structure allows affiliate members to enact change through their club and State Association.

Nationals
List of MAAA Nationals competitions held since 1938

 2022 1st West Wyalong Nationals 
 2021 rescheduled due to Covid-19 pandemic
 2020 cancelled due to Covid-19 World Pandemic 
 2019 71st West Wyalong NSW
 2018 70th West Wyalong NSW
 2017 69th Whalan NSW / Albury NSW (No RC or FF)
 2016 No Nationals held due to hosting of CL World Championships Perth WA
 2015 68th Brisbane Qld
 2014 No Nationals held this year 
 2013 67th Albury / Wodonga Vic
 2012 66th Albury NSW
 2011 65th Perth WA 
 2010 64th Dalby Qld
 2009 63rd Albury / Wodonga Vic
 2008 62nd Albury NSW
 2007 61st Perth WA
 2006 60th Albury / Wodonga Vic
 2005 59th Fleurieu Peninsular SA
 2004 58th Richmond NSW
 2003 57th Busselton WA
 2002 56th Albury / Wodonga Vic
 2001 55th Albury / Wodonga Vic
 2000 54th Busselton WA
 1999 53rd Nowra NSW
 1998 52nd Toowoomba Qld
 1997 51st Wakerie SA
 1996 50th Darwin NT
 1995 49th Ballarat Vic
 1994 48th Mundijong WA
 1993 47th Wagga Wagga NSW
 1992 46th Bundaberg Qld
 1991 45th Wakerie SA
 1990 44th Bendigo Vic
 1989 43rd Bunbury WA
 1988 42nd Amberly Qld
 1987 41st Richmond NSW
 1986 40th Wakerie SA
 1985 39th Wangaratta Vic
 1984 38th Mandura WA
 1983 37th Richmond NSW
 1982 36th Warwick Qld
 1981 35th Horsham Vic
 1980 34th Albany WA
 1979 33rd Goulburn NSW
 1978 32nd Amberly Qld
 1977 31st Camperdown Vic
 1976 30th Bunbury WA
 1975 29th Loxton SA
 1974 28th Camden NSW
 1973 27th Amberly Qld
 1972 26th Geelong Vic
 1971 25th Notham WA
 1970 24th Strathalbyn SA
 1969 23rd Wallacia NSW
 1968 22nd Warrnabool Vic
 1967 21st Northam WA
 1966 20th Strathalbyn SA
 1965 19th Canberra ACT
 1964 18th Melbourne Vic
 1963 17th Strathalbyn SA
 1962 16th Camden NSW
 1961 15th Echuca Vic
 1960 14th Rosewood Qld
 1959 13th Gawler SA
 1958 12th Camden NSW
 1957 11th Cambelltown Tas
 1956 10th Taralgon Vic 
 1955 9th Archerfield Qld
 1954 8th Mallala SA
 1953 7th Toowoomba Qld
 1952 6th Bendigo Vic
 1951 5th Camden NSW
 1950 4th West Beach SA (included R/C)
 1949 3rd Melbourne Vic
 1948 2nd Bankstown NSW (included Control Line)
 1939 to 1947 - No nationals held due to WWII
 1938 1st Sydney NSW, Centennial Park Sydney NSW and Richmond NSW (Free flight only)

See also
Fédération Aéronautique Internationale
Academy of Model Aeronautics, the United States association of aeromodelling
Radio Controlled Model Aircraft
Control Line Model Aircraft
Free Flight Model Aircraft
Model aircraft
Gordon Burford
Cox Models
Cox model engine

Notes

External links 
 MAAA - Model Aeronautical Association of Australia
 FAI - Fédération Aéronautique Internationale aeromodelling webpage
 AMAS - Australian Miniature Aerosport Society

Aviation organisations based in Australia
Clubs and societies in Australia
Model aircraft
Hobbyist organizations
Air sports